Yin Hao (born 1979) is a Chinese International Master former chess player. He is currently the Rating Officer for the Chinese Chess Association and is a qualified International Arbiter (2002).

Yin competed for the China national chess team once at the Chess Olympiads (1996) with an overall record of two games played (+1 −0 =1), and once for the "B team" at the Men's Asian Team Chess Championship (1999) with an overall record of five games played (+1 −1 =3).

China Chess League
Yin Hao has played for Jiangsu chess club in the China Chess League (CCL).

See also
Chess in China

References

External links

Chessmetrics Career ratings for: Yin Hao

1979 births
Living people
Chinese chess players
Chess International Masters
Chess arbiters